Thomas or Tom Eaton may refer to:

 Thomas M. Eaton (1896–1939), U.S. Representative from California
 Thomas Eaton (general) (1739–1809), military officer in the North Carolina militia
 Thomas R. Eaton, New Hampshire businessman and politician
 Tom Eaton (comedian), American prop comic
 Tom Eaton (musician), American multi-instrumentalist, composer, producer, and engineer